Luis de Ulloa Pereira (c. 15 December 1584 - 1674) was a Spanish writer.

He was born in the town of Toro in the region of Castille, Spain. His father had held the position of attorney and member of the town Council. Luis was able to study in Valladolid, where his uncle lived, but did not attend university. 

He craved for a role in the Madrid court, but soon returned to his family home in Toro, with funds scarce and a habit of gambling. He widowed twice and married three times. Through the intervention of don Ramiro Núñez de Felípez de Guzmán, Duke of Medina de las Torres and son in law of the Conde Duque de Olivares, Luis did get an appointment as magistrate for León (1625-1631) and Logroño (1633-1637). In the latter town, he published his best-known work: La Raquel. This poem is based on a story that claims King Alfonso VIII had an ill-fated relationship with a Jewish paramour Rahel la Fermosa.

In 1643, the Conde Duque of Olivares, met with Luis on a visit to Toro; the poet is said to have been wounded in a duel defending the Count Duke. Luis was able to travel to Madrid and meet various luminaries and writers, including Luis de Góngora, As well as receive them in visits to Toro. His poetry shared in style with Góngora's culteranismo, but was often more clear and direct:

He was also a writer of non-fiction reflections on daily life an Epístola a un caballero amigo, que vivía en Sevilla, where he praises the life at court In Madrid. In his Memorias familiares y literarias and Relaciones he recounts apparently veiled autobiographical observations.  He also wrote plays such as La mujer contra el consejo, No muda el amor semblante, Porcia y Tancredo, and Pico y Canente.

References

1584 births
1674 deaths
17th-century Spanish writers
17th-century Spanish poets